Joshua Piers Fuller (born 9 February 1992) is an English footballer who plays as a midfielder at North Northumberland League side Berwick Town.

He last played for Northern Counties East League side Grimsby Borough. He previously played as a professional in the Football League for Grimsby Town from 2009 until 2011, and a brief spell with Spalding United on loan.

Career

Grimsby Town
Fuller was promoted to the Grimsby first team on the final day of the 2008–09 season, and was named as a substitute for the game with Macclesfield Town. In the 68th minute of play, manager Mike Newell brought the youngster into the game to replace Chris Llewellyn. The game was drawn 0–0 with Grimsby finishing the season in 22nd on 41 points. Fuller featured again in the first match of the 2009–10 season against Cheltenham Town, coming on for the 82nd minute with Grimsby losing 2–1. On 15 August 2009, Fuller made his first start for the club, at home to Crewe Alexandra.

On 23 November 2010, exactly one year and twelve days since Fuller's last first team appearance for Grimsby the midfielder was allowed to join Spalding United on a one-month loan deal.

On 18 April 2011 Fuller was told by the new managerial duo of Rob Scott and Paul Hurst that he no longer has a future with the club. He departed the club shortly after when his contract expired.

Grimsby Borough
Josh spent the 2011-12 pre-season with Grimsby Borough and on 16 July 2011 joint manager Nigel Fanthorpe announced Josh would sign for the club once the relevant paperwork were sorted out. Before signing for Borough, he played for Brigg Town in a pre-season friendly against former club Grimsby Town, before returning to Borough to sign on a permanent basis. Fuller was released at the end of the 2012–13 season only to rejoin them in October 2013.

Berwick Town
Fuller now plays for North Northumberland League side Berwick Town, he signed on for the 2021–22 season and remained with the club the next summer.

Honours

Grimsby Town
Midland Floodlit Youth Cup: 2009–10

Career statistics

References

External links

Josh Fuller statistics at Grimsby Town official website

1992 births
Living people
Footballers from Grimsby
English footballers
Association football midfielders
Grimsby Town F.C. players
Spalding United F.C. players
Grimsby Borough F.C. players
English Football League players
National League (English football) players